Heinrich Lhotzky [lotski] (April 21, 1859 in Klausnitz/Claußnitz – November 24, 1930 in Ludwigshafen am Bodensee) was a German-born Protestant author (religiöser Schriftsteller).

He acted as a pastor for German settlers in Bessarabia (1886–1890).

Literary works 
 An co-editor of Blätter zur Pflege des persönlichen Lebens" (1898–1904)
 An editor of the "Leben" (1905–1911)
 Der Weg zum Vater, 1903
 Die Seele deines Kindes, 1908
 Vom Erleben Gottes, 1908
 Das Buch de Ehe, 1911
 Der Planet und ich, 1925
 Wenn man alt wird, 1919

External links
 
 Antiquario - Handelsplattform für antiquarische Buecher at www.antiquario.de
 Lexikon Geschichte Baden+Württemberg: L (von Landauer bis Ludwigsburg) at www.s-line.de

Protestant writers
German Protestant clergy
Moldovan writers
Moldovan male writers
1859 births
1930 deaths
People from Mittelsachsen
German male non-fiction writers